Habib Bank AG Zurich is a Swiss multinational commercial bank which is based in Zurich, Switzerland. It has its operations in Hong Kong, Kenya, Pakistan, South Africa the United Arab Emirates and the United Kingdom.

History
Habib Bank AG Zurich was founded on 25 August 1967 by the Pakistani Habib family separate from their main banking business Habib Bank Limited which was later nationalized under the nationalization scheme.

Ownership
The bank is fully owned by Gefan Finanz AG (incorporated in Zug), which is in turn owned by a trust structure. The trust is 100% owned by members of the Mohamedali Habib branch of the Habib family. The beneficial owners are:

 Habib M. Habib (25%)
 Muhammad H. & Hyder M. Habib (25%)
 Reza S. Habib (25%)
 other Habib family members (25%)

Gallery

See also

 House of Habib

References

House of Habib
Swiss companies established in 1967
Banks established in 1967
Banks based in Zürich
Multinational companies headquartered in Switzerland